Fem van Empel (born 3 September 2002) is a Dutch professional racing cyclist. In January 2021, she won the women's under-23 race at the 2021 UCI Cyclo-cross World Championships. During the 2022-2023 season she won the women's elite race at the World Championships and the European Cyclo-cross Championships. On January 22, 2023, she secured overall victory at the UCI Cyclo-cross World Cup. (2022–23)
On 16 Feb 2023 at Brussels,Fem clinched the X20Badkammers Trophy..The previous week, her first race in the World Champions jersey, competing in the X20 Badkammers at Lille she finished 1st doing a "Pidcock" (posing as Superwoman) across the finish line.

Major results

Cyclo-cross

2019–2020
 3rd National Junior Championships
2020–2021
 1st  UCI World Under-23 Championships
2021–2022
 1st  National Under-23 Championships
 UCI World Cup
1st Val di Sole
1st Flamanville
 Superprestige
2nd Heusden-Zolder
 Ethias Cross
2nd Lokeren
 3rd  UCI World Under-23 Championships
 3rd  UEC European Under-23 Championships
2022–2023
 UCI World Championships
1st  Elite race
1st  Team relay
 1st  UEC European Championships
 1st  Overall UCI World Cup
1st Waterloo
1st Fayetteville
1st Tábor
1st Maasmechelen
1st Antwerpen
1st Dublin
1st Benidorm
2nd Beekse Bergen
2nd Overijse
2nd Hulst
3rd Zonhoven
 1st Overall X²O Badkamers Trophy
1st Koppenberg
1st Baal
1st Hamme
1st Lille
1st Brussels
2nd Koksijde
 Exact Cross
1st Kruibeke
1st Beringen
2nd Meulebeke
 3rd National Championships

Mountain Bike

2019
 3rd Cross-country, National Junior Championships
2020
 2nd Cross-country, National Junior Championships
 3rd  Eliminator, UCI World Championships
2021
 2nd  Eliminator, UEC European Championships
2022
 1st  Cross-country, National Under-23 Championships
 2nd  Cross-country, UEC European Under-23 Championships

Road

2022
 3rd  Road race, UEC European Under-23 Championships

References

External links
 
 

2002 births
Living people
Dutch female cyclists
Place of birth missing (living people)
Cyclo-cross cyclists
Sportspeople from 's-Hertogenbosch
Cyclists from North Brabant
21st-century Dutch women